Semambu is a state constituency in Pahang, Malaysia, that has been represented in the Pahang State Legislative Assembly since 2004.

The state constituency was created in the 2003 redistribution and is mandated to return a single member to the Pahang State Legislative Assembly under the first past the post voting system.

Demographics

History 
2004–2016: The constituency contains the polling districts of RTP Bukit Goh, Kampung Padang, Bukit Istana, Semambu, Bukit Sekilau, Indera Mahkota 1, Bukit Ubi, Bukit Setongkol, Taman LKNP, Chenderawasih, Indera Mahkota 2.

2016–present: The constituency contains the polling districts of Kampung Padang, RTP Bukit Goh, Bukit Istana, Semambu, Bukit Sekilau, Indera Mahkota 1, Bukit Ubi, Bukit Setongkol, Taman LKNP, Chenderawasih, Indera Mahkota 2.

Polling districts 
According to the federal gazette issued on 31 October 2022, the Semambu constituency is divided into 11 polling districts.

Representation history

Election results

References 

Pahang state constituencies